Nano Today is dedicated to publishing the most influential and innovative work across nanoscience and technology. The journal considers any article that informs readers of the latest research and advances in the field, research breakthroughs, and topical issues which express views on developments in related fields. Through its unique mixture of peer-reviewed articles, the latest research news, and information on key developments, Nano Today provides comprehensive coverage of this exciting and dynamic field. Established in 2006, it is published six times a year by Elsevier.

References

Elsevier academic journals
Chemistry journals
Nanotechnology journals